Maleye N'Doye (born August 19, 1980) is a Senegalese professional basketball player for BBC Nyon of the Swiss Basketball League.  He is a member of the Senegalese national team, where he participated at the 2014 FIBA Basketball World Cup.

N'Doye joined BBC Nyon in 2018. He re-signed with the team on August 6, 2020.

References

1980 births
Living people
Furman Paladins men's basketball players
JDA Dijon Basket players
Le Mans Sarthe Basket players
Orléans Loiret Basket players
Metropolitans 92 players
Power forwards (basketball)
Senegalese men's basketball players
Senegalese expatriate basketball people in France
Senegalese expatriate basketball people in Portugal
Senegalese expatriate basketball people in the United States
S.L. Benfica basketball players
Small forwards
Basketball players from Dakar
2014 FIBA Basketball World Cup players